Sipajhar Assembly constituency is one of the 126 assembly constituencies of Assam Legislative Assembly. Sipajhar forms part of the Mangaldoi Lok Sabha constituency.

Members of Legislative Assembly 
 2021: Paramananda Rajbongshi, Bharatiya Janata Party

References

External links 
 

Assembly constituencies of Assam